"Booyah" is a song by the Dutch record producer duo Showtek featuring co-production by Dutch record producers We are Loud and vocals by Dutch singer Sonny Wilson. It was released on 19 August 2013, through Spinnin' Records, and re-released on 18 October 2013 in collaboration with Polydor Records. The new version was adapted for radio and includes a drum and bass section. It entered the UK Singles Chart at number 5, making it the first Showtek release to chart in the UK, on 27 October 2013. A remix EP featuring Lucky Date and Cash Cash's remixes among others was released on 8 November 2013. "Booyah" is an electro-house song with reggae influences and a drum and bass section.

Music video
A music video to accompany the release of "Booyah" was first released onto YouTube on 17 September 2013 at a total length of four minutes and thirteen seconds. The video was taken in Muswell Hill, Crouch End and Finsbury Park, as well as on the London Underground and a London double-decker bus on route W7.

Sonny Wilson
Sonny Wilson is a Dutch singer-songwriter, who has influences of reggae and reggae fusion. As well as this song, Wilson has only had one other major collaboration, being featured on David Guetta's "Sun Goes Down". It also features Canadian reggae fusion/pop group MAGIC!, and also has co-production by Showtek, which makes it Wilson's second collaboration with them.

Track listing

Chart performance

Weekly charts

Year-end charts

Certifications

Release history

In popular culture
"Booyah" was the 2014–15 Philadelphia Flyers Goal Song. The Cleveland Browns used "Booyah" as their touchdown song for the 2016 season.

Vancouver Canucks forward Jannik Hansen used "Booyah" as his personalized goal song beginning in 2015-16.

The song had been used by the Halifax Thunderbirds during their inaugural 2019-20 NLL season.

References 

2013 singles
Showtek songs
Spinnin' Records singles
2013 songs
Reggae fusion songs